Thomas H. Anderson Jr. (born March 17, 1946) is an American diplomat. He was Ambassador of the United States to Barbados, Dominica, St Lucia, Antigua, St. Vincent, and St. Christopher-Nevis-Anguilla from 1984 to 1986 under U.S. President Ronald W. Reagan.

Biography
Anderson was born in Gulfport, Mississippi. He received a Bachelor of Arts in 1968 from the University of Mississippi at Oxford. He is a proud Sigma Nu of the Epsilon Xi chapter at the University of Mississippi. Anderson served in the Mississippi National Guard before joining Hancock Bank.

He worked as assistant to the vice president of the Hancock Bank in Gulfport from 1969 to 1972. From 1972 to 1984, Anderson was an assistant to U.S. Representative Trent Lott of Mississippi's 5th congressional district, since the 4th district. He was also a member of the Southern Federal Savings and Loan Association in Gulfport.

After his ambassadorships, Anderson ran for the U.S. House of Representatives in a 1989 special election after Republican Congressman Larkin I. Smith died in a plane crash. In the primary, he took a strong second place to Democrat state Senator Gene Taylor and Democrat state Attorney General Mike Moore, but lost in the runoff to Taylor by a two-to-one margin. Afterwards, he was chief of staff to then United States Senator Trent Lott. Anderson is the chairman of the board of Team Washington, Inc.

References

 FJC Bio

1946 births
Living people
People from Gulfport, Mississippi
Ambassadors of the United States to Barbados
Ambassadors of the United States to Antigua and Barbuda
Ambassadors of the United States to Dominica
Ambassadors of the United States to Saint Lucia
Ambassadors of the United States to Saint Kitts and Nevis
Ambassadors of the United States to Saint Vincent and the Grenadines
Employees of the United States Congress
Mississippi Republicans
University of Mississippi alumni
20th-century American diplomats